The 1960 Dallas Texans season was the inaugural season of Lamar Hunt's American Football League franchise based in Dallas, Texas. Head coach Hank Stram led the team to an 8–6 record and second place in the AFL's Western Conference.

For the Texans' inaugural season, team owner Lamar Hunt pursued both legendary University of Oklahoma coach Bud Wilkinson and New York Giants defensive assistant Tom Landry to lead his Texans franchise. Wilkinson opted to stay at Oklahoma, while Landry was destined to coach the NFL's expansion franchise in Dallas. Hunt settled on a relatively unknown assistant coach from the University of Miami, Hank Stram. "One of the biggest reasons I hired Hank was that he really wanted the job", Hunt explained. "It turned out to be a very lucky selection on my part."

The Texans set up offices in the Mercantile National Bank Building, while Jerry Foss headquartered the AFL offices out of Dallas, as well. Reserved seats were $4, general admission $2, and high school students paid $0.90 that initial season. Don Rossi served as the team's General Manager until November when he was succeeded by Jack Steadman.

The Texans conducted their inaugural training camp at the New Mexico Military Institute in Roswell, New Mexico. The club embarked on a whirlwind pre-season barnstorming tour that featured road games in Oakland, Tulsa, Boston, Abilene, and Little Rock. An announced crowd of 51,000 at the Cotton Bowl witnessed a 24–3 victory against Houston on September 2 as the club concluded a perfect 6–0 preseason record.

The Texans had a strong home-state identity with quarterback Cotton Davidson from Baylor, linebacker Sherrill Headrick from TCU, and running back Abner Haynes from North Texas. Haynes led the league with 875 rushing yards and nine TDs, as well as combined net yards (2,100) and punt return average (15.4).

The Texans also had a flashy, high-scoring club that finished the year at 8–6 as three close losses kept the squad from challenging for the division title. The Texans averaged 24,500 for their home games, the highest average in the league.

The Texans would earn their first win in franchise history in week 2 over the Oakland Raiders, who would eventually become the team's biggest rival.

1960 AFL Draft
In the inaugural American Football League Draft, the Texans chose the following players to fill-up their squad:

Jack Atcheson, E, Western Illinois
George Boone, T, Kentucky
Chris Burford, E, Stanford
Earl Ray Butler, T, North Carolina
Gail Cogdill, E, Washington State
James Crotty, HB, Notre Dame
Gary Ferguson, T, SMU
Tom Glynn, C, Boston College
Gene Gossage, T, Northwestern
Jim Heineke, T, Wisconsin
William Jerry, G/T, South Carolina
John Kapele, T, BYU
Louis Kelley, FB, New Mexico State
Gilmer Lewis, T/G, Oklahoma
John Malmberg, T/G, Knox College
Arvle Martin, C, TCU
Don Meredith, QB, SMU
Tom Moore, HB, Vanderbilt
Ola Murchison, E, COP
Bob Nelson, C, Wisconsin
Jim Norton, E, Idaho
Warren Rabb, QB, LSU
Howard Ringwood, HB, BYU
Johnny Robinson, HB, LSU
John Saunders, FB, South Carolina
Glenn Shaw, FB, Kentucky
Gordon Speer, HB, Rice
Jack Stone, G, Oregon
Marvin Terrell, G, Mississippi
Emery Turner, G, Purdue
Joe Vader, E, Kansas State
Carroll Zaruba, HB, Nebraska

Grady Alderman, G/T, Detroit
Herman Alexander, T/G, Findlay (OH)
Taz Anderson, HB, Georgia Tech
Jim Beaver, T/G, Florida
Bill Beck, T/G, Gustavus Adolphus
Gary Campbell, HB, Whittier
Vernon Cole, QB, North Texas State
Toby Deese, T/G, Georgia Tech
Carl Dumbald, T/G, West Virginia
Charles Elizey, C, Mississippi State
Tom Gates, HB, San Bernardino
Austin (Goose) Gonsoulin, HB, Baylor
Clark Holden, HB, USC
Dewitt Hoopes, T/G, Northwestern
Don Leebern, T/G, Georgia
Bill Thompson, C, Georgia
Billy Tranum, E, Arkansas
Jim Vickers, E, Georgia
Larry Ward, E, Lamar Tech
Paul Winslow, HB, North Carolina College
Doug Pat Brown, T/G, Fresno State

Regular season
The Texans finished their inaugural season 8–6, with three wins coming by shutout.

Standings

Schedule

Postseason
The Texans did not participate in the AFL Championship by finishing the season in second place of the Western Conference.

References

External links
1960 Dallas Texans season on Database Football

Kansas City Chiefs seasons
Dallas Texans
1960 in sports in Texas